Archaeoprepona is a genus of Neotropical charaxine butterflies in the family Nymphalidae, native to Mexico, Central America, northern South America, and the Caribbean. The underside of their wings is pale brownish, while the upperside is dark with a distinct bright blue band.

Taxonomy 
Most taxa were described before Hans Fruhstorfer coined the genus Archaeoprepona in 1916, and were therefore originally placed in other genera. This includes the type species of the genus, Archaeoprepona demophon, first described as Papilio demophon by Carl Linnaeus. Even after the description of the genus Archaeoprepona, the members have commonly been included in Prepona instead.

Species in the genus Archaeoprepona:

 Archaeoprepona Fruhstorfer, 1915
 Archaeoprepona amphimachus (Fabricius, 1775) – white-spotted prepona or turquoise-banded shoemaker
 Archaeoprepona camilla (Godman & Salvin, [1884])
 Archaeoprepona chalciope (Hübner, [1823])
 Archaeoprepona demophon (Linnaeus, 1758) – one-spotted prepona, banded king shoemaker
 Archaeoprepona demophoon (Hübner, [1814]) – Hübner's shoemaker, silver king shoemaker
 Archaeoprepona licomedes (Cramer, [1777]) – Cramer's shoemaker
 Archaeoprepona meander (Cramer, [1775]) – Meander prepona
 Archaeoprepona phaedra (Godman & Salvin, [1884])

Biogeographic realm
Neotropical realm

Systematics

Clade showing phylogenetics of Archaeoprepona

Etymology
Amphimachus is a figure in Greek mythology.

References

External links

Archaeoprepona Photographs of specimens. Many are types
Pteron in Japanese but has binomial names.

Charaxinae
Nymphalidae of South America
Taxa named by Hans Fruhstorfer
Nymphalidae genera